is a Japanese footballer currently playing as a defender for Vegalta Sendai.

Career statistics

Club
.

Notes

References

External links

1997 births
Living people
Japanese footballers
Association football midfielders
Fukuoka University alumni
J2 League players
J3 League players
Roasso Kumamoto players